This is an alphabetical list of rock music groups whose primary genre is post-grunge.

0–9

A

B

C

D

E

F

G

H

I

J

K

L

M

N

O

P

R

S

T

U

V

W

See also

 Alternative rock
 List of alternative rock artists
 Alternative metal
 List of alternative metal artists
 Grunge
 List of American grunge bands
 Nu metal
 List of nu metal bands

External links
 Allmusic

Post-grunge groups